Jan Fredrik Tobias (Freddie) Lindgren (born 15 September 1985) is a Swedish motorcycle speedway rider.  He has twice won the bronze medal at the Speedway World Championship and won the world team championships in 2015.

Career
Born in Örebro, Sweden. Lindgren's father Tommy was a speedway rider before him, and his younger brother Ludvig also rides. Lindgren first appeared for Wolverhampton Wolves during the 2003 season as the team struggled with injuries. At the age of just 17, Freddie made his debut for the team and impressed enough to be brought back the following season when again injuries hit the club.

In 2005, he moved over to full-time and averaged 7.44 for Wolves in his debut full season and in 2006 he improved to average 8.12. In 2007 as Freddie started to show up more on the World scene, he averaged 8.35 again for Wolves. Also in 2007, he was awarded a permanent wild card place for the 2008 Speedway Grand Prix series. During the 2008 season, Freddie was awarded with the Wolves captaincy role, previously held by fellow Swede Peter Karlsson and as a full-time Grand Prix rider he averaged 8.52 for Wolves. Due to his top 10 finish in the 2008 SGP, Lindgren was awarded a second successive permanent wild card place for the 2009 Speedway Grand Prix. 

In 2010, he finished 11th on 87 points but qualified for the 2011 Series after beating Janusz Kolodiej and Magnus Zetterstrom in a run-off in the GP Challenge Final.

 

In 2009, Lindgren topped the averages in the UK with a 10.43 average and only dropped 7 points at home all season. Wolverhampton went on to win the Elite League title. 2010 saw him again back at Wolverhampton where his brother Ludvig also gained a place. Again he finished as the highest averaging rider in the Elite League and helped Wolves reach the title playoffs.

During the 2015 Speedway World Cup, he was part of the Swedish team that won the world team title. He had previously finished runner-up twice (2005 & 2006) and third three times. In 2016, Lindgren won the Elite League with Wolves and also won the Elite League Riders' Championship at the end of the season. Lindgren's 2017 season for Wolves would be his last in the United Kingdom, bringing a 14 year  spell to an end.

In 2020, he finished third and won the bronze medal in the World Championship for the second time, the 2020 Speedway Grand Prix season saw him collect 117 points including winning the Gorzów Grand Prix.

In 2021, he rode for Västervik Speedway but was later diagnosed with Long COVID and was forced to end his season early. Despite the illness he managed to finish in fourth place during the 2021 Speedway Grand Prix. In 2022, Lindgren finished in fourth place again in the 2022 Speedway World Championship, after securing 103 points during the 2022 Speedway Grand Prix.

Major results

World individual Championship
2004 Speedway Grand Prix - 31st
2006 Speedway Grand Prix - 20th
2007 Speedway Grand Prix - 16th
2008 Speedway Grand Prix - 10th
2009 Speedway Grand Prix - 9th
2010 Speedway Grand Prix - 11th
2011 Speedway Grand Prix - 9th
2012 Speedway Grand Prix - 8th (including Swedish grand prix win)
2013 Speedway Grand Prix - 11th
2014 Speedway Grand Prix - 10th
2016 Speedway Grand Prix - 11th
2017 Speedway Grand Prix - 8th (including Warsaw grand prix win)
2018 Speedway Grand Prix - 3rd (including Czech Republic grand prix win)
2019 Speedway Grand Prix - 4th (including Swedish grand prix win)
2020 Speedway Grand Prix - 3rd (including Gorzów grand prix win)
2021 Speedway Grand Prix - 4th
2022 Speedway Grand Prix - 4th

World team Championships
2005 Speedway World Cup - runner up
2006 Speedway World Cup - runner up
2007 Speedway World Cup - 5th
2008 Speedway World Cup - 3rd
2009 Speedway World Cup - 3rd
2010 Speedway World Cup - 3rd
2011 Speedway World Cup - 3rd
2012 Speedway World Cup - 4th
2015 Speedway World Cup - Winner
2016 Speedway World Cup - 3rd
2017 Speedway World Cup - runner up
2018 Speedway of Nations - 6th
2019 Speedway of Nations - 5th
2020 Speedway of Nations - 4th
2022 Speedway of Nations - runner up

See also 
 List of Speedway Grand Prix riders

References 

1985 births
Living people
Swedish speedway riders
Wolverhampton Wolves riders
Sportspeople from Örebro